Fresnay-sur-Sarthe (literally Fresnay on Sarthe) is a commune in the Sarthe department in the region of Pays de la Loire in north-western France. On 1 January 2019, the former communes Coulombiers and Saint-Germain-sur-Sarthe were merged into Fresnay-sur-Sarthe.

History 
It is thought that a few people were already installed on the rock overhanging the River Sarthe during the Roman occupation. In the 7th century, around ten families were registered on the site called Faxinidum.

The city history really begins with the erection of the castle, which was initiated approximately in the 10th century (perhaps in the 9th century), under the reign of Charles the Bald. Express mention can be found on an official document dated October 12, 997, first year of the reign of Robert the Pious. The purpose of the castle was mostly to ensure protection of the river crossing.

William the Conqueror captured the castle twice; first in 1063, then again in 1073. Young Robert of Bellême, who particularly distinguished himself during the siege, was proclaimed as a knight from William's hand.

In 1100, Henry I decided to join the Maine to the Anjou. At that time, the city was then called Fresnay-le-Vicomte. A few more attacks were conducted against Fresnay, and the city finally found peace only at the beginning of the 14th century. That period permitted the development of farming.

The strategic importance of the Castle of Fresnay was particularly highlighted during the Hundred Years' War. Successively occupied by the adventurers of Philippe de la Chèze, in 1356, then captured by the English troops of King Henry V, in 1417, it came back to the French, thanks to Ambroise de Loré, future companion of Joan of Arc; Captain of the Castle in 1418, he later became "Prévôt" de Paris.

In 1420, the city was again taken by the English who occupied the place for thirty years (1420 to 1450). Heavily affected by the Hundred Years' War, Fresnay also had to suffer from the Wars of Religion; in 1562, it was devastated by the Huguenots. From then, the castle started to gradually fall into ruins.

From the beginning of 17th century and until the end of the 19th century, the culture of hemp grew in importance; that textile was especially used for ships' sails. New quarters were created in Fresnay's area; the "Bourg-Neuf" and the "Creusot". Some weavers' houses, from that time, remain visible today. In 1793, the old wooden bridge were replaced by one made of stone.

During the 20th century, the weaving workshops of Fresnay were replaced by agronomics and domestic appliance industries.

Demography 
As of the last census data (1999), 2,363 persons live in Fresnay (the "Fresnois"); the city is the center of a dozen rural districts, now grouped in a "Alpes Mancelles Rural Districts Community", that comprises a total of 8,000 people leaving in the region.

Twin Towns
  Spilsby, United Kingdom
 , Germany

See also
Communes of the Sarthe department

References

Communes of Sarthe